Yossi Shivhon (born March 22, 1982) is a retired Israeli footballer who serves as assistant coach for Maccabi Herzliya.

Honours
 Maccabi Tel Aviv
Toto Cup: 2004–05, 2008–09

 Hapoel Tel Aviv
Israel State Cup: 2010–11

References

External links

1982 births
Living people
Israeli footballers
Israel international footballers
Association football midfielders
Hapoel Petah Tikva F.C. players
Maccabi Tel Aviv F.C. players
Hapoel Tel Aviv F.C. players
Hapoel Be'er Sheva F.C. players
Maccabi Netanya F.C. players
Hapoel Nir Ramat HaSharon F.C. players
Maccabi Herzliya F.C. players
Israeli Premier League players
Liga Leumit players
Footballers from Petah Tikva